A tuyere or tuyère is a tube, nozzle or pipe through which air is blown into a furnace or hearth.  

Air or oxygen is injected into a hearth under pressure from bellows or a blowing engine or other devices. This causes the fire to be hotter in front of the blast than it would otherwise have been, enabling metals to be smelted or melted or made hot enough to be worked in a forge, though these are blown only with air. This applies to any process where a blast is delivered under pressure to make a fire hotter.  

The term (like many technical terms relating to ironmaking) was introduced to England from French with the new technology of the blast furnace and finery forge in around 1500, and was sometimes anglicised as tue-iron or tue iron.  

Following the introduction of hot blast, tuyeres are often water-cooled.

Examples

 A bloomery normally had one tuyere.  
 Early blast furnaces also had one tuyere, but were fed from bellows perhaps 12 feet (3.7m) long operated by a waterwheel.  During the Industrial Revolution, the blast began to be provided using steam engines, initially Watt engines working blowing cylinders. Improvements in foundry practice enabled gas-tight cast iron pipes to be produced, enabling one engine to deliver blast to several sides of a furnace, through multiple tuyeres.  
 A finery forge contained finery and chafery hearths, usually one of the latter and one to three of the former.  Each hearth was equipped with its own set of bellows, blowing into it through a tuyere.  
 The blacksmith's hearth at their forge has a tuyere, often blown by foot-operated bellows.  
 Tuyeres were also used in smelting lead and copper in smeltmills.  
 Modern blast furnaces may have up to 42 tuyeres, through which the hot blast is injected in the furnace. They are usually made from copper and cooled with a water jacket to withstand the extreme temperatures.

References

Steelmaking
Industrial furnaces